Tensta metro station is a station on the blue line of the Stockholm metro, located in the district of Tensta. The station was opened on 31 August 1975 as part the first stretch of the Blue Line between T-Centralen and Hjulsta. The trains were running via Hallonbergen and Rinkeby.

Gallery

References

External links
Images of Tensta

Blue line (Stockholm metro) stations
Railway stations opened in 1975